Los Caños was a successful Spanish boyband of the 2000s comprising Kiko (Juan Manuel Gaviño Román, born 1985), Juande (Juan de Dios Carrera Tracista, born 1984) and Javi (Alberto Javier Couceiro Gómez, born 1985).

Discography

Los Caños (2000, CD)
 A veces 	  	
 El virus del amor 	  	
 Nunca llueve al sur de California 	  	
 Contigo 	  	
 Niña piensa en ti	  	
 Eres para mí 	  	
 Melina 	  	
 Baila morena 	  	
 Una vida por delante 	  	
 Te extraño

Agua de luna (2002, CD)
 Agua de Luna 	  	
 A lo mejor me querías 	  	
 Sin decirnos nada 	  	
 Si tú bailas para mí 	  	
 Sentir como yo siento 	  	
 Nena, dime por qué 	  	
 Qué puedo hacer 	  	
 Huellas en mi corazón 	  	
 A mi lado mi vida 	  	
 Adriana 	  	
 Lo que es echarte de menos 	  	
 Ella es 	  	
 Cartitas de amor

Los Locos Somos Asi (2003)
 Los Locos Somos Así letra
 Tú No Sabes letra
 Hoy La Vi letra
 Bailar En Tu Boca letra
 Quiero Ser letra
 Dónde Voy Sin Tí letra
 Lluvia Pasajera letra
 Aquel Amor letra
 Hay Problemas letra
 Te Pido La Noche letra
 No Me Pidas Que Te Sueñe letra
 Créeme letra
 Y Tú No Ves letra

Lo Mejor De Los Caños (2005)
 Dime Algo Bonito letra
 Niña Piensa En Ti letra
 A Veces letra
 De Que Manera letra
 Una Vida Por Delante letra
 Hoy La Vi letra
 Agua De Luna letra
 Enséñame letra
 Sin Decirnos Nada letra
 Tú No Sabes letra
 Cartitas De Amor letra
 Bailar En Tu Boca letra
 Un Alma Para Dos letra
 Créeme letra
 Hay Problemas letra
 Sin Pensar letra
 Bailar En Tu Boca (Con José Flores) letra
 Niña Piensa En Ti (Bulgaria Remix) letra
 Niña Piensa En Ti (Con Susana) letra

References

Spanish boy bands